The Counts at Svansta (Swedish: Grevarna på Svansta) is a 1924 Swedish silent drama film directed by Sigurd Wallén and starring Einar Fröberg, Hugo Björne and Magda Holm.

Cast
 Einar Fröberg as 	Count Nils Storm
 Hugo Björne as Per Storm
 Thure Holm as 	Hans Wärner
 Magda Holm as 	Elina
 Inga Tidblad as 	Ofelia Grane
 Manda Björling as 	Baroness Gustava Grane
 Gerda Björne as 	Emilia Grane
 Carl Browallius as Baron Grane
 Gösta Gustafson as 	Ståhl
 Justus Hagman as 	The Doctor
 Inez Lundmark-Hermelin as 	Cecilia Grane
 Harry Roeck Hansen as 	Gipsy
 Tor Weijden as Luffar-Jonte

References

Bibliography
 Larsson, Mariah & Marklund, Anders. Swedish Film: An Introduction and Reader. Nordic Academic Press, 2010.

External links

1924 films
1924 drama films
Swedish drama films
Swedish silent feature films
Swedish black-and-white films
Films directed by Sigurd Wallén
1920s Swedish-language films
Silent drama films
1920s Swedish films